Nkoloma Stadium is a multi-use stadium in Lusaka, Zambia.  It is currently used mostly for football matches and serves as the home for Red Arrows F.C. and Young Arrows F.C., both of the Zambian Premier League.  The stadium holds 5,000 people.

External links
 Stadium information

Football venues in Zambia
Buildings and structures in Lusaka
Sport in Lusaka
Red Arrows F.C.